The Crișul Mic is a left tributary of the river Barcău in Romania and Hungary. It discharges into the Berettyó in Szentpéterszeg.

References

Rivers of Romania
Rivers of Bihor County
Rivers of Hungary
International rivers of Europe